Phyllodesma tremulifolium, the aspen lappet, is a moth of the family Lasiocampidae. It is found in Europe.

The length of the forewings is 15–18 mm for the males and 18–20 mm for the females. The moth flies from April to July depending on the location.

The larvae feed on various deciduous trees, such as oak, poplar and birch.

External links

Lepidoptera of Belgium
Lepiforum.de
Vlindernet.nl 

Lasiocampidae
Moths described in 1810
Moths of Europe
Moths of Asia
Taxa named by Jacob Hübner